Paradiestrammena is a genus of cave or camel crickets in the subfamily Aemodogryllinae and tribe Aemodogryllini.  Originating in Asia, species have been found in Borneo, the Indo-China region and Japan.

Species
The Orthoptera Species File lists:
Paradiestrammena autumnalis (Gorochov, 1994)
Paradiestrammena contumi Gorochov, 2002
Paradiestrammena enata Gorochov, 2002
Paradiestrammena gravelyi (Chopard, 1916) - type species (as Diestrammena gravelyi Chopard) - from the Lengong Caves, Perak, Malaysia.
Paradiestrammena maculata (Chopard, 1916)
Paradiestrammena mistshenkoi (Gorochov, 1998)
Paradiestrammena sarawakana (Chopard, 1940)
Paradiestrammena storozhenkoi (Gorochov, 1998)
Paradiestrammena tarbinskyi Gorochov, 1998
Paradiestrammena trigona Zhu, Lu & Shi, 2020
Paradiestrammena vernalis Gorochov, 1998
Paradiestrammena vitalisi Chopard, 1919
Paradiestrammena xima Zhu, Lu & Shi, 2020

References

External links

Ensifera genera
Rhaphidophoridae
Orthoptera of Indo-China